The Consortium for the Management of Basic and Applied Research in Africa south of Sahara or COMREFAS is an international multidisciplinary institution whose purpose is to structure and enhance the basic and applied research in Africa in the following scientific fields:

 Economics,
 Management Science,
 Public law,
 Private Law,
 Humanities,
 Arts,
 Social Sciences,
 Applied Science and Technology.

History

Created in 2009 by the Network of Universities of Science and Technology of the Countries of Africa south of the Sahara (RUSTA), the COMREFAS is the research center common to all member institutions of the RUSTA (University of Science and Technology of Benin, University of Science and Technology of Togo, University of Science and Technology of Ivory Coast, Higher Institute of Technology of Ivory Coast, etc.).

Its head office is located in Abidjan, the economic capital of Ivory Coast.

Mission

The COMREFAS's mission is to contribute to the development and enhancement of scientific research in the countries of Africa. This is part of a desire to unite the scientific community around a shared vision, challenging and promising future for African societies.

To do this, the COMREFAS promote :

 the academic and scientific cooperation,
 exchanges with organizations and institutions,
 dissemination of knowledge through scientific meetings,
 the training of doctoral students, etc.

Components

The COMREFAS consists of five research laboratories :

 Research Laboratory in Management of Organizations (LAREGO)
 Laboratory of Applied Studies and Research in Public and Private Law (LAREAD)
 Laboratory of Experimental Studies in Economics (LAEXSE)
 Multidisciplinary Laboratory Experiments in Social Sciences (LAPLESS)
 Multidisciplinary Research Laboratory Applied Science and Technologies (LAPRESTA)

References

External links
 Official website 

Research institutes in Ivory Coast
College and university associations and consortia in Africa
Organizations based in Abidjan
2009 establishments in Ivory Coast